Saltdal Fjord is a fjord arm of Skjerstad Fjord in the municipality of Saltdal in Nordland county, Norway.

The inlet of the fjord lies between Hjelbunes, a headland to the west, and Langruodden, a promontory to the east. The village of Setså lies on the east side of the fjord, slightly inland from the shore. On the west lies the hamlet of Vik inside the bay formed by Tangodden, a peninsula jutting north into the fjord. Rognan lies at the foot of the fjord, and this is also where the Saltdal River flows into the fjord. West of the river's mouth lie the hamlets of Saksenvik and Botn.

The Nordland Line railway and the European route E6 highway both run along the entire east side of the fjord, and Norwegian County Road 515 runs along the west side.

References

Fjords of Nordland
Saltdal